Congressional districts of the Philippines refers to the electoral districts or constituencies in which the country is divided for the purpose of electing 253 of the 316 members of the House of Representatives (with the other 63 being elected through a system of party-list proportional representation). The country is currently divided into 253 congressional districts, also known as legislative districts or representative districts, with each one representing at least 250,000 people or one entire province. The 1987 Constitution of the Philippines initially provided for a maximum 200 congressional districts or 80 percent of the maximum 250 seats for the lower house, with the remaining 20 percent or 50 seats allotted for sectoral or party-list representatives. This number has since been revised with the enactment of several laws creating more districts pursuant to the 1991 Local Government Code.

Philippine congressional districts are contiguous and compact territories composed of adjacent local government units where practicable. They are single-member districts which return one member each to the lower chamber, elected to serve a maximum of three consecutive three-year terms through a first-past-the-post voting system. The Philippine Statistics Authority conducts a constitutionally mandated quinquennial census whose figures are used to determine the number of congressional districts to which each province or city is entitled, in a process called apportionment.

List

See also 
 Senatorial districts of the Philippines
 Lists of electoral districts by nation

References 

 
Politics of the Philippines
Philippines
Philippines politics-related lists